Jennifer Capriati was the defending champion but did not compete that year.

Kimiko Date won in the final 6–4, 6–2 against Mary Joe Fernández.

Seeds
A champion seed is indicated in bold text while text in italics indicates the round in which that seed was eliminated.

  Conchita Martínez (quarterfinals)
  Gabriela Sabatini (semifinals)
  Mary Joe Fernández (final)
  Anke Huber (first round)
  Kimiko Date (champion)
  Zina Garrison-Jackson (quarterfinals)
  Amanda Coetzer (first round)
  Judith Wiesner (first round)

Draw

External links
 1994 Peters NSW Open Singles and Doubles Main Draw 

1994 Peters NSW Open
1994 WTA Tour